Stuart West may refer to:

 Stuart West, evolutionary biologist at the University of Oxford
 Stu West (born 1964), bassist in the English punk band The Damned
 Stewart West (born 1934), Australian politician